Never Let You Go is a 1983 album by Rita Coolidge and was released on the A&M Records label.  The album originally did not contain the song "All Time High" from the movie Octopussy.  After the success of the song, it was added to later pressings and included on the album.

Track listing

Side one
"I'll Never Let You Go" (James House, Wendy Waldman) – 4:18
"Tempted"* (Glenn Tilbrook, Chris Difford) – 3:45
"Stop Wasting Your Time"* (Ian Dury, Chas Jankel) – 4:12
"Shadow in the Night"* (Jimbeau Hinson, Tony Brown) – 3:35
"Only You" (Vince Clark) – 3:15

Side two
"You Do It" (Deborah Allen, Eddie Struzick, Rafe Van Hoy) – 3:19
"Fools in Love"* (Joe Jackson) – 3:44
"Do You Really Want to Hurt Me" (M. Craig, R. Hay, J. Moss, G. O'Dowd) – 4:00
"You Ought to Be with Me"* (Al Green, Willie Mitchell, Al Jackson) – 3:15
"We've Got Tonite"* (Duet with Jermaine Jackson) (Bob Seger) – 4:38

Charts

References

Rita Coolidge albums
1983 albums
Albums produced by David Anderle
A&M Records albums
Albums recorded at United Western Recorders